The Sopwith 2B2 Rhino was a British two-seat triplane bomber designed and built by Sopwith Aviation Company as a private venture. The Rhino was powered by a  Beardmore Halford Pullinger inline piston engine. Only two aircraft were built and the type did not enter production.

Development and design
In mid-1917, the Sopwith Aviation Company prepared a design for a single-engine bomber aircraft, the Sopwith Rhino.  As it did not match any official specification, it received no orders from the Royal Flying Corps or Royal Naval Air Service, but Sopwith was granted a licence to allow it to build two prototypes as private ventures.

The Rhino was a single bay tractor triplane with ailerons fitted to all three sets of wings. It had a deep fuselage, which accommodated an internal bomb-bay capable of carrying 450 lb (205 kg) of bombs in a self-contained pack that could be loaded with bombs separately and then winched into the aircraft to allow rapid re-arming. Defensive armament was a synchronised Vickers machine gun firing through the propeller disc, while the observer in the rear cockpit had a Lewis gun on a pillar mount. It was powered by a 230 hp (172 kW) BHP inline engine driving a two-bladed propeller, cooled by radiators each side of the fuselage.

The first prototype made its maiden flight at Brooklands in October 1917, with initial testing showing it to be nose heavy and subject to engine overheating. The second prototype, which differed in having the primitive pillar mounting for the observer's gun replaced by a more modern scarff ring, joined it for official testing at Martlesham Heath in February and March 1918.  Performance was unimpressive, with the aircraft having a poor ceiling and low speed, and it was rejected as a service type.  The two Rhinos were then used as testbeds for development of propellers.

Specifications

References

Notes
 Mason considers these dimensions suspect and suggests a length of 30 ft 3 in (9.22 m) and span of 41 ft (12.5 m), although it states that these numbers are also suspect.

1910s British bomber aircraft
Rhino
Aircraft first flown in 1917
Triplanes